The Martin Harris Gravesite, in a cemetery in Cache County, Utah overlooking the town of Clarkston, Utah, is a gravesite from 1875 with a monument placed in 1925. It was listed on the National Register of Historic Places in 1980.

The site is the grave of Martin Harris (1783–1875), one of three witnesses to the golden plates received by Joseph Smith. Harris served as the first scribe to Smith in translating the plates to write the Book of Mormon.

The monument is engraved with the statement:Martin Harris one of the three witnesses to the Divine authenticity of the Book of Mormon. Born Easttown, Saratoga County, New York, May 18, 1783. Died Clarkston, Utah July 10, 1875.

It is the only known site in Utah associated with Harris.

References

Monuments and memorials in Utah
National Register of Historic Places in Cache County, Utah
Buildings and structures completed in 1875
Mormon cemeteries